is a former Japanese football player and he is the currently assistant manager J1 League club of FC Tokyo.

Playing career
Sato was born in Fuji on May 11, 1976. After graduating from Shimizu Commercial High School, he joined his local club Shimizu S-Pulse in 1995. However he could hardly play in the match. In 1998, he moved to Japan Football League club Montedio Yamagata. He played as regular player and was elected Rookie of the Year awards. In 1999, he moved to newly was promoted to J2 League club, FC Tokyo. He played as right side midfielder and the club was promoted to J1 League from 2000. He also was elected New Hero Award at 1999 J.League Cup. Although he played as regular player until 2001, his opportunity to play decreased behind Naohiro Ishikawa. In 2003, he moved to Yokohama F. Marinos. He played many matches as right side midfielder and the club won the champions for 2 years in a row (2003-2004). However his opportunity to play decreased behind Hayuma Tanaka in late 2004. In 2005, he moved to his first club Shimizu S-Pulse. However he could not play many matches and he moved to J2 club Kashiwa Reysol in June 2006. He played many matches and the club was promoted to J1 from 2007. In 2008, he moved to J2 club Vegalta Sendai and played in 1 season. In 2009, he move to Japan Football League club V-Varen Nagasaki and played as regular player. In 2012, although his opportunity to play decreased, the club won the champions and was promoted to J2 from 2013. He retired end of 2014 season at the age of 38.

Club statistics

References

External links

1976 births
Living people
Association football people from Shizuoka Prefecture
Japanese footballers
J1 League players
J2 League players
Japan Football League (1992–1998) players
Japan Football League players
Shimizu S-Pulse players
Montedio Yamagata players
FC Tokyo players
Yokohama F. Marinos players
Kashiwa Reysol players
Vegalta Sendai players
V-Varen Nagasaki players
Association football midfielders